Cœur de pirate is the debut album by Canadian singer Cœur de pirate, released September 16, 2008 on Grosse Boîte.

"Ensemble"
The album attracted some media attention in the United States in February 2009 when François Vachon, a photographer from Quebec City, used her song "Ensemble" as the soundtrack to a popular YouTube video depicting his baby son playing with toys, leading to coverage on Good Morning America and a favourable review from blogger Perez Hilton.

Chart performance
As of June 21, 2009, the album had spent 80 weeks on Canada's Nielsen SoundScan charts, and has charted in France, Switzerland and Belgium.

Awards
The album was nominated for Francophone Album of the Year at the 2009 Juno Awards, and was a longlisted nominee for the 2009 Polaris Music Prize.

Track listing

Quebec / Canada release (2008)
 "Le long du large" (2:39)
 "Comme des enfants" (2:51)
 "Fondu au noir" (2:08)
 "Corbeau" (2:04)
 "Berceuse" (1:57)
 "Intermission" (2:58)
 "Printemps" (2:25)
 "Ensemble" (3:07)
 "La vie est ailleurs" (2:27) 
 "Pour un infidèle" (duet with Jimmy Hunt) (2:31)
 "Francis" (2:55)
 "C'était salement romantique" (2:52)

French release (2009)
 "Le Long du large" (2:39)
 "Comme des enfants" (2:51)
 "Berceuse" (1:57)
 "Printemps" (2:25)
 "Francis" (2:55)
 "Intermission" (2:58)
 "Ensemble" (3:07)
 "C'était salement romantique" (2:52)
 "La vie est ailleurs" (2:27)
 "Pour un infidèle" (with Julien Doré) (2:31)
 "Corbeau" (2:04)
 "Fondu au noir" (2:08)

All lyrics and music by Béatrice Martin.

Personnel
Musicians
Béatrice Martin - vocals, piano
David Brunet - bass, electric and acoustic guitars, banjo, glockenspiel, percussion, synthesizer, accordion, piano
Renaud Bastien - bass, acoustic guitar
Joseph Perrault - drums
Jean-Denis Levasseur - double bass, clarinet
Lise Beauchamp - oboe
Benoît Paradis - trombone
Lysandre Champagne - trumpet
Julie Brunet - alto
Kristin Molnar - violin
Technicians
Produced and arranged by David Brunet
Executive Producer - Eli Bissonnette
Mixing by Robert Langlois.
Recorded by Robert Langlois, David Brunet, Marc St-Laurent and Nicolas Ouellette
Artwork by Vanda Daftari.
Photography by John Londono.

Charts

Year-end charts

Certifications

References

2008 debut albums
Cœur de pirate albums
French-language albums
Bravo Musique albums